Act, Manya! is a 1991 Soviet science fiction comedy film directed by Roman Yershov.

Plot
Two scientists: the biologist-geneticist (Yevgeny Vesnik) and the programmer Kostya (Sergey Bekhterev) wish to create a cyborg to fight against the mafia. However, in the programming process there is a mistake: the robot is given the form of a female glamour model about whom the programmer secretly fantasized about.

However, the resulting superwoman Manya (Yuliya Menshova) despite her contrasting external appearance is ready to perform the initial plan: the combat against racketeering. And she successfully fulfills the task: neither bullets or by land-to-air missiles hurt her. However the mafia finds out, how to defeat the crime fighters: a real pin-up girl is presented to Kostya and he forgets about "Super Manya", and Manya is unable to cope with the latest achievements of the Academy of Sciences. Nevertheless, everything ends successfully, crime is destroyed, but only with this the superwoman's program has ended and is about to be retired. The creators brighten up the last days of her existence with a deserved vacation.

Cast
Yuliya Menshova — Manya
Sergey Bekhterev — programmer Kostya
Yevgeny Vesnik — biologist—geneticist Evgeniy Danilovich
Georgy Millyar — functionary Ivan Akimovich
Anatoly Rudakov — man who invited Manya to dance
Viktor Bychkov — Bychkov
Yevgeny Morgunov — filmmaker
Stanislav Sadalsky — butcher Vasya
Semyon Furman — Alik
Sergey Selin — pilot
Roman Filippov — General
Anatoly Azo — Chief
Leonard Varfolomeev — restaurateur
Igor Dobriakov — mafia member
Sergei Polezhaev — Ivan Akimovich's secretary
Vladimir Rublev — robber
Sergey Tverdokhlebov — Cheese
Alexander Slastin — coordinator
Shukhrat Irgashev — episode
Karina Razumovskaya — episode
Vladimir Basov — entrepreneur at the market

References

External links

Lenfilm films
Soviet science fiction comedy films
Russian science fiction comedy films
1990s science fiction comedy films
1991 comedy films
1991 films
1990s Russian-language films